Paolo Angeli (born 1970 in Olbia, Sardinia, Italy) is a guitarist, composer, ethnomusicologist and instrument builder associated with traditional Sardinian music, flamenco, jazz, post-rock and experimental music. He plays his own prepared Sardinian guitar, an orchestra-instrument with 18 cords, a hybrid between guitar, cello and drums, gifted with hammers, pedals at variable speed.

Discography
 1995, "Dove dormono gli autobus", CD, Erosha 
 1997, "Linee di fuga", CD, Posada Jazz Project, Erosha PJP 002, ERH 012Erosha 
 2003, "Bucato", ReR Megacorp PA1
 2004, "MA.RI ", with Antonello Salis Auand Records AU9005 	
 2005, "Nita – L'Angelo Sul Trapezio (An Imaginary Soundtrack)",  ReR Megacorp PA2 
 2007, "Tessuti (Paolo Angeli Plays Frith & Björk) ", (CD, Album),ReR Megacorp ReR PA3 
 2009, "Free Zone Appleby", with Evan Parker, Ned Rothenberg (CD, Album), PSI (3) psi 08.04
 2010, "Tibi", (ReR),
 2010, "Giornale di bordo", in collaboration with Antonello Salis, Gavino Murgia, Hamid Drake
2011, Itsunomanika, with Takumi Fukushima –  (CD, Album) ReR Megacorp (ReR PA5), Offset Records (OFF555003), Le Arti Malandrine (ALU008), Angeli Productions (none) 	
 2013,  "Sale quanto basta", (ReR)
 2017, "Talea", (Solo World Tour 2015/16) 2CD, ReR Megacorp – AnMa ReR PA10

References

Bibliography
Andrea Aguzzi, Chitarre Visionarie. Conversazioni con chitarristi alternativi,Lulu, 2014

External links
Official site

1970 births
Living people
People from Olbia
Italian jazz guitarists
Free improvisation
21st-century guitarists